{{DISPLAYTITLE:C9H12N4O3}}
The molecular formula C9H12N4O3 may refer to:

 Methylliberine, an isolate of coffee beans, tea, cola nuts, guarana, cocoa, and yerba mate
 Theacrine, a purine alkaloid found in Cupuaçu and a Chinese tea known as kucha